The Geru is a left tributary of the river Siret in Romania. It discharges into the Siret near Independența. Before the regularization of the lower course of the Siret, it was a tributary of the Bârlădel, a secondary branch of the Siret. Since the regularization works, the Geru discharges directly into the Siret, and the remaining course of the Bârladel collects the left Siret tributaries to the east of the Geru and the Suhu. The Geru flows through the villages Mândrești, Valea Mărului, Cudalbi, Costache Negri, Tudor Vladimirescu, Vameș, Piscu and Independența.

References

Rivers of Romania
Rivers of Galați County